Bruno Amílcar Valdez Rojas (born 6 October 1992) is a Paraguayan professional footballer who plays as a defender for Argentine Primera División club Boca Juniors and the Paraguay national team.

A right-footed defender, he can play as a centre-back and right-back.

Club career
Valdez made his professional debut with Sol de America but in July 2014 it was sold to Cerro Porteño. In 2015, Valdez helped Cerro to win the Apertura championship.

In June 2016, Valdez was sold to Club América of Mexico.

International career
In May 2015, Valdez was called up to the provisional 30-man roster for the Paraguay national football team to play at the 2015 Copa América. On 28 May, he was included in the 23-man final squad for the tournament by coach Ramón Díaz. On 6 June, he made his international debut as a substitute in a pre-tournament friendly against Honduras at the Estadio Manuel Ferreira in Asunción.

Career statistics

Club 
 As of 15 April 2018

International goals
Scores and results list Paraguay's goal tally first.

Honours 
Cerro Porteño
Primera División: 2015 Apertura

América
Liga MX: Apertura 2018
Copa MX: Clausura 2019
Campeón de Campeones: 2019

Boca Juniors
Supercopa Argentina: 2022

References

External links
 
 
 

1992 births
Living people
Paraguayan footballers
Paraguayan expatriate footballers
Club Sol de América footballers
Cerro Porteño players
Club América footballers
Paraguayan Primera División players
Liga MX players
Paraguay international footballers
2015 Copa América players
Copa América Centenario players
People from Villa Hayes
Association football central defenders
Expatriate footballers in Mexico
2019 Copa América players